Tsarychanka Raion was a raion (district) of Dnipropetrovsk Oblast, southeastern-central Ukraine. Its administrative centre was located at the urban-type settlement of Tsarychanka. The raion was abolished on 18 July 2020 as part of the administrative reform of Ukraine, which reduced the number of raions of Dnipropetrovsk Oblast to seven. The area of Tsarychanka Raion was merged into Dnipro Raion.

At the time of disestablishment, the raion consisted of four hromadas:
 Kytaihorod rural hromada with the administration in the selo of Kytaihorod;
 Liashkivka rural hromada with the administration in the selo of Liashkivka;
 Mohyliv rural hromada with the administration in the selo of Mohyliv;
 Tsarychanka settlement hromada with the administration in Tsarychanka.

Gallery

References

Former raions of Dnipropetrovsk Oblast
1932 establishments in Ukraine
Ukrainian raions abolished during the 2020 administrative reform